Cheranmahadevi is a panchayat town in Tirunelveli district  in the state of Tamil Nadu, India.

Etymology 
The name "Cheranmahadevi" is combination of Three words "Cheran" + "Maha" + "Devi" (Translation: Cheran's daughter Devi).

Geography
It is located on the right side bank of the Thamirabarani River. Roughtly 15 Km West of Tirunelveli and at the foot hills of Kozhundana Malai.

Canals 
Kannadian canal is the first such canal in Thamirabarani river. Now the existing one is the third such canal according to report.

Demographics

Population 
 India census, Cheranmahadevi had a population of 16,320. Males constitute 49% of the population and females 51%. Cheranmahadevi has an average literacy rate of 77%, higher than the national average of 59.5%; with male literacy of 83% and female literacy of 71%. 9% of the population is under 6 years of age.

Government and politics  
Cheranmahadevi assembly constituency is part of Tirunelveli (Lok Sabha constituency)

Civic Administration  
Cheranmahadevi is Taluk Headquarter with Sub Collector office within the town and with Judicial Court just a Km away. Cheranmahadevi is under state assembly constituency and under Tirunelveli Parliamentary constituency

Culture/Cityscape 
Agriculture is the main bread and butter for the people hence the city is surrounded by Kms of paddy field at the banks of Tamrabharani River. Also This is an ancient town which boasts Ramaswamy Temple which is older than Tanjore Peria Kovil which is 1000 years old. The road connecting with River is barricaded with Marutham trees on both side which is a fantastic look in any hours. Other side of the town is surrounded with a small Hillock called Kozhundana malai.  On both side of the hill there are 2 Murugan temples which are 300 + years old. Town is well connected to Tirunelveli, Nagerkoil, Tenkasi through bus and trains. Nearest Airport is Trivandrum & Madurai both approx 150 Kms.

Tourist Attractions 
It has a central government controlled archaeological temple named Bakthavachala vishnu temple which is considered to be a monument for its medieval carvings referring to the period of Chola and Pandiya kings. The temple was built in the year 1012-1044 A.D and devotees are allowed to worship on the day called Vidhivadha. Vidivadha aga Vyadhipadha is a Dosha in some one Jathaka ( Jenma Kundalini) and this is only  remedial temple in the world. Every month the Vyadhipadha day is falling but the Maha Vyadhipadha falls during December. People across world gather to make remedial rituals.

Transport 

Well connected with rail network to Chennai, Tenkasi and Tirunelveli

By Road  

Cheranmahadevi is about 20 km from Tirunelveli by road and rail. Buses to Ambasamudram, Papanasam, Kalakkad, Tenkasi, Valliyur and Nagercoil are available from here.

References

Cities and towns in Tirunelveli district